HMS Sutherland is a Type 23 frigate of the British Royal Navy. She is the thirteenth ship in the Duke class of frigates and is the third ship to bear the name, more than 200 years since the name was last used.

She was launched in 1996 by Lady Christina Walmsley, wife of Sir Robert Walmsley KCB. Before this occasion, Royal Navy ships had always been launched with a bottle of champagne, but Lady Walmsley broke with tradition and used a bottle of Macallan Scotch whisky.

Operational history

1997-2000
Sutherland was deployed to the Falkland Islands in the winter 1998/1999. In 2000, she was part of the task force NTG2000, the first time Royal Navy ships have circumnavigated the globe since 1986.

2001-2010
After berthing in Invergordon, HMS Sutherland was granted the freedom of the county of Sutherland at a ceremony in Dornoch on 18 September 2004. A subsequent visit to Invergordon in March 2011 was cut short, with "operational commitments" as the given reason. This was eventually revealed as her deployment as part of the UK Response Force Task Group's (RFTG) first deployment, named COUGAR 11. She returned to Invergordon in April 2013.

2011–present
In May 2011, she made a port visit to Patras, Greece following participation in exercises off Crete, after which she became involved in the operations off the Libyan coast.
On 16 June 2011, Sutherland visited Souda Bay in Crete to commemorate the 70th anniversary of the Battle of Crete, before sailing to Kalamata in Greece to conduct further World War II memorials.
On 24 July 2011, Sutherland returned to the coast of Libya as part of Operation Ellamy.

In 2012, she was part of the COUGAR 12 task group.
She took part in Exercise Joint Warrior 2013.

Sutherland to part in 2016 Exercise Griffin Strike, a UK-French combined exercise. Sutherland escorted the  through the English Channel in May 2016.
In April 2017, Sutherland was again tasked with escorting Russian warships in the English Channel, on this occasion, the Steregushchiy-class corvettes, Soobrazitelnyy and Boikiy.

Sutherland was the first vessel assigned to escort  when she embarked on sea trials in June 2017.

In 2018 Sutherland had a deployment to the Pacific Ocean. Part of her mission was "to continue the pressure campaign on North Korea", and on her return traveled through the South China Sea to assert navigation rights against Chinese claims.

Early in 2019 she served as a testbed for an integrated mount for the Martlet LMM and 30mm cannon, successfully engaging in firing operations against a motorboat sized target at the Aberporth range in Wales. In April 2021, Sutherland entered long-term refit to incorporate Sea Ceptor SAMs as well as other system updates.

Affiliations
The Highlanders, 4th Battalion Royal Regiment of Scotland
County of Sutherland
Honourable Company of Master Mariners
Sherborne School CCF
Clifton College, Bristol CCF's
TS Grenville, Paisley (Sea Cadets)
TS Duchess, Biggleswade (Sea Cadets)
Royal Dornoch Golf Club

References

External links

 

Frigates of the United Kingdom
Ships built on the River Clyde
Sutherland
1996 ships
Type 23 frigates of the Royal Navy